Gustav Adolf Friedrich Gottfried Rau (born February 20, 1878, date of death unknown) was a German track and field athlete who competed at the 1900 Summer Olympics in Paris, France. He was born in Frankfurt.

Rau competed in the 200 metre hurdles. He placed fifth in his first-round (semifinal) heat, not qualifying for the final.

References

External links 

 De Wael, Herman. Herman's Full Olympians: "Athletics 1900". Accessed 18 March 2006.
 

1878 births
Year of death missing
Sportspeople from Frankfurt
German male hurdlers
Olympic athletes of Germany
Athletes (track and field) at the 1900 Summer Olympics
Place of death missing